The 2022–23 Northern Arizona Lumberjacks men's basketball team represented Northern Arizona University in the 2022–23 NCAA Division I men's basketball season. The Lumberjacks were led by fourth-year head coach Shane Burcar, and played their home games at the Rolle Activity Center and Findlay Toyota Court in Flagstaff, Arizona as members of the Big Sky Conference. They finished the season 12–23, 5–13 in Big Sky play to finish in ninth place. They defeated Idaho, Eastern Washington, and Montana to advance to the championship game of the Big Sky tournament, their first appearance in the conference finals since 2007. There they lost to Montana State.

Previous season
The Lumberjacks finished the 2021–22 season  9–23, 5–15 in Big Sky play to finish in a tie for last place. As the No. 11 seed in the Big Sky tournament, they lost to Eastern Washington in the first round.

Roster

Schedule and results

|-
!colspan=12 style=| Exhibition

|-
!colspan=12 style=| Non-conference regular season

|-
!colspan=12 style=| Big Sky Conference season

|-
!colspan=12 style=| 

Sources

References

Northern Arizona Lumberjacks men's basketball seasons
Northern Arizona Lumberjacks
Northern Arizona Lumberjacks men's basketball
Northern Arizona Lumberjacks men's basketball